Echinocereus reichenbachii (commonly known as lace or hedgehog cactus) is a perennial plant and shrub in the cactus family. This cactus earned the Royal Horticultural Society's Award of Garden Merit.

E. reichenbachii is one of the smaller Echinocereus species. Plants are solitary or clustered in as many as 12, with erect stems that have 10 to 19 ribs. The stems are dark green and often obscured by the spines, which range from tan, brown, black, or pink, and the tips are usually darker than the shaft. The areoles are elliptical or oval, with seven to 36 spines each. E. reichenbachii are cold and heat tolerant, and prefer dry, well-drained soils near rock outcroppings.

Taxonomy
The specific epithet honors the German botanist Ludwig Reichenbach. Common names include Lace hedgehog cactus, Lace cactus, Lace hedgehog, Purple candle, and Órgano-pequeño de colores.

In 1843, German botanist Carl Adolf Terscheck named a specimen of cactus collected in Mexico Echinocactus reichenbachii, but his description was incomplete and proved unhelpful to later scholars. During the years 1848 to 1856, George Engelmann made extensive studies of a plant he named Echinocereus caespitosus. Prior to this Joseph zu Salm-Reifferscheidt-Dyck referred to plants in European collections as Echinopsis pectinate var. reichenbachiana, and he later discussed the possibility with Engelmann that these two plants were one and the same.

Despite the early indication of a naming error, Engelmann's binomial was used to describe the plant until 1893, when F.A. Haage Jr. changed Terscheck's Echinocactus reichenbachii to Echinocereus reichenbachii, which Nathaniel Lord Britton and Joseph Nelson Rose later adopted. This broke with the long-standing botanical tradition to use the earliest known name, but because Terscheck's description was lacking and possibly referred to as many as a dozen species, his binomial was supplanted by Haage's.

Variations and subspecies
Variations of Echinocereus reichenbachii include E. reichenbachii var. albertii, E. reichenbachii var. fitchii, E. reichenbachii var. albispinus, E. reichenbachii subsp. armatus, E. reichenbachii subsp. burrensis, and E. reichenbachii subsp. fitchii. Direct children include E. reichenbachii var. baileyi, E. reichenbachii var. perbellus, and E. reichenbachii var. reichenbachii.

E. reichenbachii var. albertii (commonly called the Black Lace cactus) is a federally listed endangered species of the United States that is endemic to Texas. It has been listed as endangered since 1979. Populations of E. reichenbachii var. albertii are found near the Kleberg, Jim Wells, and Refugio counties of south Texas. Destruction of habitat, over-collecting, and livestock grazing have all contributed to its endangered status.

Description

Echinocereus reichenbachii is a perennial plant and shrub. It is one of the smaller Echinocereus species. Immature specimens are spherical, and as they grow they become cylindrical. Plants are solitary or multi-branched in clusters of as many as twelve, with erect stems with 10 to 19 slightly undulate ribs. The stems are dark green and obscured by the spines, especially when the plant is dehydrated. Areoles are elliptical or oval. The spines are tan, to brown, black, purplish black, or pink, and the tips are usually darker than the shaft. The central spines tend to be the darkest.

Plants flower in early May and late June, and they fruit 6 to 10 weeks after flowering. Flowers open for just one day, but anthesis is usually staggered so plants have blooming flowers for a full week; buds are covered in white wool that hides the fruit as it develops. The flower's inner tepals are silvery pink or magenta; the outer portions are white, crimson, green, or multicolored. Flowers have 30 to 50 petals each, which are ragged or notched. Pistils are multi-lobed and green, and stamens are cream-colored or yellow.

Native habitat
E. reichenbachii native habitat includes the entirety of the Chihuahuan Desert and its nearby grasslands, as well as in woodlands of oak and juniper. In the United States, E. reichenbachii is native to Texas, New Mexico, Colorado, and Nebraska. They are also found in Kansas and Oklahoma. The variety found in Oklahoma, E. reichenbachii baileyi, have especially long "bristlelike" spines. E. reichenbachii is native to the northern Mexican states of Coahuila, Nuevo León, and Tamaulipas.

Cultivation and propagation
E. reichenbachii prefer full sun and require little water. They thrive in dry, well-drained, gravelly, clay, and loam soils, and near rock outcroppings. They are cold and heat tolerant, and grow well under glass. They are drought resistant, but susceptible to mealybugs and scale insects.

Propagation is facilitated by seeds collected as the fruits begin to dry. The species is used in commercial landscaping as ornamental features, particularly in desert environments. Plants are considered deer resistant. E. reichenbachii earned the Royal Horticultural Society's Award of Garden Merit.

Gallery

References

Bibliography

External links

reichenbachii
Flora of the Southwestern United States
Cacti of the United States
Cacti of Mexico